National Park Seminary — later called National Park College — was a private girls' school open from 1894 to 1942. Located in Forest Glen Park, Maryland, its name alludes to nearby Rock Creek Park.  The historic campus is to be preserved as the center of a new housing development.

History

College
The campus began in 1887 as "Ye Forest Inne," a summer vacation retreat for Washington, D.C., residents. The retreat did not succeed financially, and the property was sold and redeveloped as a finishing school, opening in 1894 with a class of 48 female students.  The architecture of the campus remained eclectic and whimsical. In addition to various Victorian styles, exotic designs included a Dutch windmill, a Swiss chalet, a Japanese pagoda, an Italian villa, and an English castle.
Many of these small homes with international designs were built from blueprints obtained by competing sororities, but all were designed by architect Emily Elizabeth Holman of Philadelphia, Pennsylvania. The campus also featured covered walkways, outdoor sculptures, and elaborately planned formal gardens. Among the administration was Assistant Dean of the college, Miss Edna Roeckel. In 1936 it was renamed "National Park College" and its focus was realigned with more modern education trends; it remained one of the most prestigious women's schools in the country.

Walter Reed Forest Glen Annex
With the onset of World War II, the United States Army began planning for the medical needs of returning soldiers. In 1942, the property was acquired by Walter Reed Army Hospital as a medical facility for disabled soldiers, thus closing the college. The Army paid $890,000 for the land and buildings that became the Walter Reed Forest Glen Annex. The goal was to provide to seriously injured service members a quiet, green space for rehabilitation and recovery that was within a short drive from the heavily urbanized neighborhood surrounding the hospital. Following World War II and the Korean War, the U.S. Army attempted to maintain the space with progressively limited funds; the U.S. Army employed some of the unique sorority houses as base housing for military officers who organized themselves and enlisted soldiers to maintain the seminary space.  Eventually, however, the Army lost sufficient funding from the U.S. Congress during the 1960-1970s to maintain the space and was compelled to declare the property excess, pending transfer to the General Services Administration to find a new owner.

Preservation and development
On September 14, 1972, a 27-acre (0.11-km2) National Park Seminary Historic District was listed as a national historic district on the National Register of Historic Places. In the following years, the historical integrity of the property was threatened by neglect and vandalism. The Greek Revival Odeon Theater was lost to arson in 1993. Local preservation groups took action and "Save Our Seminary" (SOS) was formed in 1988.  In the late 1990s, Senator Paul Sarbanes was instrumental in encouraging the Army to make repairs to some of the buildings and, ultimately, in releasing the property for development. With private donations, SOS began an exterior restoration project of the pagoda in 1999, completed in 2003.

In 2003, a development team led by the Alexander Company began implementing a plan to preserve the campus as the core of a new residential neighborhood. The residential neighborhood consists of townhomes, condominiums, and apartments. The townhomes are in a variety of architectural styles from Spanish mission to colonial. The apartments, some of which are affordable housing, are in the main structure. Condominiums are located in several buildings that branch off of the main structure including the Senior House, Senior Annex, and Music Hall. There are condominiums in the Chapel and Aloha House.  The Alexander Company's plans for redevelopment of the site were featured in a 2006 New York Times story.

Portions of the abandoned seminary grounds were made available for townhouse development which began in 2006. Portions of the old-growth forest in the glen were cut down for the commercial housing development and portions were retained; likewise, parts of the historically sensitive yards and courts were spared from redevelopment.

Gallery

References

External links

 About National Park Seminary
 Save Our Seminary at Forest Glen
 The Seminary at Forest Glen
 National Seminary Geocache page
 Forest Glen Info on eastghost.com and many pictures: 1, 2, 3, 4, 5, 6, 7
, at Maryland Historical Trust
National Park Seminary, Main, Linden Lane, Silver Spring, Montgomery, MD at HABS
Braemar, Silver Spring, Montgomery, MD at HABS
National Park Seminary, Edgewood, Between Linden Lane & Beach Drive, Silver Spring, Montgomery, MD at HABS

 
1894 establishments in Maryland
1942 disestablishments in Maryland
Buildings and structures in Silver Spring, Maryland
Defunct private universities and colleges in Maryland
Educational institutions established in 1894
Forest Glen Park, Maryland
Former women's universities and colleges in the United States
Historic American Buildings Survey in Maryland
Historic districts on the National Register of Historic Places in Maryland
National Register of Historic Places in Montgomery County, Maryland
School buildings on the National Register of Historic Places in Maryland
University and college buildings on the National Register of Historic Places in Maryland
History of women in Maryland